Cornelis van Tienhoven (ca. 1601 Utrecht- November 1656 ?, Manhattan ?) was secretary of the New Netherlands from 1638 to 1656 and as such one of the most influential people in New Amsterdam.

Van Tienhoven was born the son of Luyt (Lucas) Cornelisz van Tienhoven and Jannetje Adriaens de Haes. He arrived in New Amsterdam as a Dutch West Indies Company accountant in 1633 on the same ship as the new director of the colony Wouter van Twiller. He was promoted to schout-fiscaal (usually translated as secretary) with the arrival of Director Willem Kieft in 1638 and retained that title under Peter Stuyvesant in 1647. In 1648 he married the 16-year-old Rachel Vigne. During the 1649 mission of Adriaen van der Donck to the Netherlands to plead to the States-General of the Netherlands for local governance for the residents of New Amsterdam, Cornelis van Tienhoven also went as the representative of Peter Stuyvesant and argued against it.

When New Amsterdam was granted the right to establish a local government in 1652, he became the first schout in the colony. His actions appear to have had a very negative effect on the relationship of the colonists and the native people, instigating several retaliatory raids by the latter. His last misdeed, when Stuyvesant was on a visit to the Dutch colony in Delaware, seems to have led to the Peach Tree War, after which the Company directors back in Holland ordered Stuyvesant to fire van Tienhoven, which happened in June 1656.

Van Tienhoven's hat and cane were found in the Hudson River on November 18, 1656, but it is unknown if he drowned, was murdered by one of his enemies, or simply disappeared, as he was supposed to appear in court. At the time his wife was expecting his fourth child. Van Tienhoven's younger brother escaped at around the same time to Barbados, but there is no indication that Cornelis came along.

External links
Cornelis Luycasz van Tienhoven biography at the Historical Society of the New York Courts
A profile in The Morning News (published and accessed April 3, 2008)

1600s births
1656 deaths
Dutch accountants
American people of Dutch descent
People of New Netherland
People from Utrecht (city)